The 2023 Nigerian presidential election in Bauchi State was held on 25 February 2023 as part of the nationwide 2023 Nigerian presidential election to elect the president and vice president of Nigeria. Other federal elections, including elections to the House of Representatives and the Senate, will also be held on the same date while state elections will be held two weeks afterward on 11 March.

Background
Bauchi State is a large, diverse northeastern state with a growing economy and vast natural areas but facing an underdeveloped yet vital agricultural sector, desertification, and a rising sexual violence epidemic. Politically, the state's 2019 elections were a mixed bag for both major parties. In federal elections, Buhari held the state for the APC albeit with a reduced margin of victory while the APC swept all senate seats by winning back two seats it lost due to defections. Both major parties lost seats in House of Representatives elections to the benefit of the minor People's Redemption Party. On the state level, Mohammed unseated APC incumbent Governor Mohammed Abdullahi Abubakar by a narrow margin as the APC held the House of Assembly.

Polling

Projections

General election

Results

By senatorial district 
The results of the election by senatorial district.

By federal constituency
The results of the election by federal constituency.

By local government area 
The results of the election by local government area.

See also 
 2023 Bauchi State elections
 2023 Nigerian presidential election

Notes

References 

Bauchi State gubernatorial election
2023 Bauchi State elections
Bauchi